Leonid Alekseyevich Kulik (Russian: Леонид Алексеевич Кулик; 19 August 1883 – 14 or 24 April 1942) was a Soviet mineralogist who is noted for his research into meteorites.

He was born in Dorpat, (now Tartu, Tartu County, Estonia), and was educated at the Imperial Forestry Institute in Saint Petersburg and the Kazan University. He served in the Russian military during the Russo-Japanese War, then spent some time in jail for revolutionary political activities. He then served with the Russian military during World War I.

Following the war he became an instructor, teaching mineralogy in Tomsk. In 1920 he was offered a job at the Mineralogical Museum in St. Petersburg.

In 1927, he led the first Soviet research expedition to investigate the Tunguska event, the largest impact event in recorded history, which had occurred on 30 June 1908. He made a reconnaissance trip to the region, accompanied by Nikolay Ivanovich Fedorov and others, and interviewed local witnesses. He circled the region where the trees had been felled and became convinced that they were all turned with their roots to the center. However he did not find any meteorite fragments from the impact.

During World War II he again fought for his country, this time in a paramilitary militia. He was captured by the German army and died in a prisoner of war camp of typhus.

Honors
 Asteroid 2794 Kulik is named for him.
 The crater Kulik on the Moon is named after him.

References

External links 
Virtual Exploration Society: Leonid Kulik at www.unmuseum.org
 Шышанаў В. У пошуках «беларускага дзіва» // Культура. 2002. №14. 13-19 красавіка. С.14.

1883 births
1942 deaths
Russian mineralogists
Russian military personnel of the Russo-Japanese War
Russian military personnel of World War I
Soviet military personnel of World War II
Soviet prisoners of war
Saint-Petersburg State Forestry University alumni
People from Tartu
Deaths from typhus